is a professional Japanese baseball player. He plays pitcher for the Yomiuri Giants.

External links

 NPB.com

1994 births
Living people
Baseball people from Osaka Prefecture
Japanese baseball players
Nippon Professional Baseball pitchers
Yomiuri Giants players
People from Shijōnawate